Conviction Kitchen is a Canadian documentary/reality television series that premiered September 13, 2009, on Citytv. Starring chef Marc Thuet and his wife Biana Zorich, the series documents the process of launching a restaurant, Conviction, in Toronto, to be staffed by rehabilitated ex-convicts.

A second series of Conviction Kitchen was recorded in Vancouver, British Columbia during the summer of 2010. The renowned but rundown restaurant Delilah's, located at 1789 Comox Street at Denman St, was temporarily rebranded as the Vancouver-based Conviction Kitchen.

An Australian version of the show was aired in 2011.

See also
 Conviction Kitchen (Australia)

References

External links

Conviction Kitchen main website
Australian version website

2009 Canadian television series debuts
2000s Canadian documentary television series
Citytv original programming
Food reality television series
Television shows set in Vancouver
Penology
2000s Canadian reality television series